Mocis marcida, the withered mocis, is a species of moth of the family Erebidae. It is found from the coast of North Carolina to Florida, west to Texas, rarely straying northward as far as New York.

Adults are on wing from April to November or all year round in southern Florida and Texas. There are multiple generations per year.

The larvae feed on various grasses.

References

External links
Images
Bug Guide

Moths described in 1852
Mocis